The 2013–14 Cupa României was the seventy-sixth season of the annual Romanian football knockout tournament. The winner of the competition qualifies for the third qualifying round of the 2014–15 UEFA Europa League, if they have not already qualified for European competition; if so then the first non-European place of the 2013–14 Liga I qualifies for the second qualifying round of the 2014–15 UEFA Europa League.

Round of 32 
The round of 32 ties will be played between 24 and 26 September. The winners of the Fifth round was joined by Liga I teams. All times are EEST (UTC+3).

Round of 16
All times are EET (UTC+2).

Quarter-finals
All times are EET (UTC+2).

Semi-finals

1st leg

2nd leg

Final

References

2013–14 in Romanian football
2013–14 domestic association football cups
2013-14